Robert Ndugwa Migadde (born December 7, 1980) is a Ugandan politician and member of parliament from Buvuma Island County. He is a member of National Resistance Movement (NRM). He sits on the committees on National Economy and Agriculture.

Life and education 
Migadde is a Christian and a member of Catholic denomination. He earned a bachelor's degree in urban planning and a master's degree in business administration from Makerere University before obtaining a post-graduate diploma in urban economic development from Galilee College, Israel.

References 

Living people
1980 births
National Resistance Movement politicians
Makerere University alumni
Members of the Parliament of Uganda
People from Buvuma District